The 1933 presidential elections in Latvia took place on April 4, 1933, during the term of the 4th Saeima.  In the first round of voting, incumbent President Alberts Kviesis was re-elected President.

Candidates

Election process and results
Along with incumbent President Alberts Kviesis and Speaker of the Saeima Pauls Kalniņš, the little-known candidate Miķelis Bite, who had not yet passed the deputy's mandate at the time of the elections, was nominated for the presidency. In the first round, Kviesis received a sufficient number of votes to be re-elected as President.

References

Presidential elections in Latvia
Latvia
1930 in Latvia